Thuso Mpuang (born 15 August 1985) is a South African sprinter who specializes in the 200 metres.

Mpuang represented South Africa at the 2008 Summer Olympics in Beijing. He competed at the 4x100 metres relay together with Leigh Julius, Ishmael Kumbane and Hannes Dreyer. In their qualification heat they did not finish due to a mistake in the baton exchange and they were eliminated. He also took part in the 200 metres individual, running the distance in 20.87 seconds and only placing sixth in his heat. Still his time was among the best losing times and he achieved a second round spot. With 21.04 seconds he finished seventh in his second round heat, failing to qualify for the semi finals.

Achievements

Personal bests
 100 metres 10.35 1.80 Pretoria 27 March 2008
 200 metres 20.64 0.60 Pretoria 28 March 2008

Progression Report
100 meters
 2008 10.35 1.80 Pretoria 2008-03-27
 2007 10.42 -0.20 Pretoria 2007-04-13
 2006 10.65 Pretoria 2006-04-07
200 meters
 2009 20.92 0.60 Stellenbosch 2009-04-04
 2008 20.64 0.60 Pretoria 2008-03-28
 2007 20.75 Gaborone 2007-04-05
 2006 21.18 0.20 Pretoria 2006-04-08
 2005 21.48 0.40 Marrakech 2005-07-16

Honours
200 meters
 11th IAAF World Junior Championships 21.71 -0.60 Beijing (Chaoyang Sport Center) 2006-08-17
 4th IAAF World Youth Championships 21.78 1.20 Marrakech 2005-07-16

References

External links 

1984 births
Living people
Athletes (track and field) at the 2008 Summer Olympics
Olympic athletes of South Africa
South African male sprinters
Universiade medalists in athletics (track and field)
Universiade gold medalists for South Africa
Universiade silver medalists for South Africa
Universiade bronze medalists for South Africa
Medalists at the 2009 Summer Universiade
Medalists at the 2011 Summer Universiade
20th-century South African people
21st-century South African people